Dunk is a Pakistani drama serial that premiered on 23 December 2020 on ARY Digital. It deals with the false allegations of harassment and stars Bilal Abbas Khan as Haider, Sana Javed as Amal, Yasra Rizvi as Saira and Noman Ijaz as Professor Humayun. The serial has been written by Mohsin Ali and directed by  Badar Mehmood, the duo who previously collaborated for mega-hits, Aisi Hai Tanhai and Ishqiya. According to producer Fahad Mustafa, the series is based on a real incident from Sargodha. The story is inspired by an incident that took place in MAO college, Sargodha, where a professor committed suicide over false harassment allegations by a student.

The series has received mixed reviews from critics who called the story drag and annoying and also criticised the director for using very loud sound sequences. Most praise the performances of Yasra Rizvi and Bilal Abbas Khan.

Plot 

The story revolves around a university where a student Amal Faraz accuses her Professor Humayun for harassing her, and everyone supports her to fight back, including her fiancée Haider Nawaz. After a while, it is revealed that Amal made a false accusation on her Professor as in to save her fiance Haider as he had accidentally sent some inappropriate photos and videos to a female professor, Professor Anjum, the real scene that took place was that Amal asked Professor Humayun to forgive Haider. When he declines, she locks the door and harasses him and tells him she will ruin his life by accusing him of harassment and she scatters the things in the room and leaves.

Professor Humayun and Amal have one last conversation before the innocent professor walks out the inquiry committee and leaves the university. Having no proof of his innocence and as he has mentally lost the war, he commits suicide and this news disheartens Haider as it is revealed that he heard the last conversation between Professor Humayun and Amal and he found out Amal's truth. On Haider and Amal's wedding evening, Haider decides not to marry Amal because of the false accusations she put on Professor Humayun and he is exiled from the house by his father Nawaz.

Amal marries Safeer Nawaz, Haider's older brother on one condition that is to bring Haider back to the house. After a while, Haider marries Minal, Amal's friend, and gets exiled out of the house again after Amal accuses him of raping her. Haider then tells Minal the truth about Professor Humayun. Safeer also finds out the truth and divorces Amal in court.

Haider takes Amal to an abandoned place and keeps her there in isolation until morning to collect some proofs, when Haider shows Amal's father Faraz a video of Amal confessing the  truth to Haider which was recorded by Sultan, Haider's friend. Heartbroken after finding out his daughter's truth and having no hope left in the world, Faraz commits suicide like Professor Humayun and his wife goes to court and slaps Amal in front of everyone.

Amal then confesses to her crimes and is sentenced to ten years in prison, 5 years for the false accusations on Professor Humayun and 5 years for the false accusations on Haider, and she goes to jail after Faraz's funeral. Haider, Nawaz, Safeer, Nawaz's wife Saba, and Minal all reconcile. The show ends with Saira, Professor Humayun's wife, putting flowers on his grave.

Cast 
Bilal Abbas Khan as Haider Nawaz (Minal's husband)
Sana Javed as Amal Faraz (Safeer's wife)
Azekah Daniel as Minal (Haider's wife)
Yasra Rizvi as Saira (Humayun's wife)
Nauman Ijaz as Professor Humayun (Dead)
Laila Wasti as Saba Nawaz (Haider and Safeer's mother)
Saife Hassan as Faraz (Dead)
Fahad Shaikh as Safeer Nawaz
Salma Hassan as Mahnoor Faraz
Kanwal Khan as Maha Faraz
Gul-e-Rana as Aapa Bi
Shahood Alvi as Nawaz (Haider and Safeer's father)
Annie Zaidi as Ms. VC (Vice-Chancellor)
Tara Mahmood as Professor Anjum
Khalid Zafar as Professor
Fahima Awan as Saman (Minal's sister-in-law)
Rashid Farooqui as Amal's lawyer
Usman Bashir as Judge

Awards and nominations

Lux Style Awards

Fuchsia Awards

See also 
 List of programs broadcast by ARY Digital

References

External links
 Official website

Pakistani television shows
Pakistani drama television series
2020 Pakistani television series debuts
Pakistani television series
Urdu-language television shows